Valdiviomyia is a genus of hoverflies from the family Syrphidae, in the order Diptera.

Species
Valdiviomyia camrasi (Sedman, 1965)
Valdiviomyia darwini (Shannon, 1927)
Valdiviomyia edwardsi (Shannon & Aubertin, 1933)
Valdiviomyia gigantea Thompson, 2017
Valdiviomyia nigra (Shannon, 1927)
Valdiviomyia ruficauda (Shannon, 1927)
Valdiviomyia shannoni Thompson, 2017
Valdiviomyia valdiviana (Philippi, 1865)

References

Diptera of South America
Hoverfly genera
Eristalinae